Arun Cherukavil, mononymously known as Arun, is an Indian actor who predominantly works in the Malayalam film industry. He made his film debut in 2000's with the role of Sooraj, one of the students, in Mohanlal starrer Life is Beautiful. After several years, He made his comeback to the film field in 2004 with Jayaraj directed 4 the People.

Personal life 
Arun is a native of Ernakulam district. He completed his higher education from St. Paul's College, Kalamassery.Later he chosen to be an actor and moved to film field.

Career 
Arun made his film debut in 2000 with Life Is Beautiful, directed by Fazil. In this film, he played the role of a teenage plus two student. After a gap of four years, he returned with 4 the People. He also had notable roles in the films Quotation and Amritham released in the same year. Later he acted in various roles as protagonist, antagonist and supporting characters. Arun, who was not active in film in the meantime, has recently made a comeback, starring in films such as Honey Bee 2, Underworld, Driving License and Anjaam Pathira.

Filmography

References 

Indian male film actors
Male actors from Kerala
Male actors in Malayalam cinema
21st-century Indian male actors
Indian male actors
Male actors from Kochi
Film people from Kerala
Indian humanitarians
1984 births
Living people